England in the High Middle Ages includes the history of England between the Norman Conquest in 1066 and the death of King John, considered by some to be the last of the Angevin kings of England, in 1216. A disputed succession and victory at the Battle of Hastings led to the conquest of England by William of Normandy in 1066. This linked the crown of England with possessions in France and brought a new aristocracy to the country that dominated landholding, government and the church. They brought with them the French language and maintained their rule through a system of castles and the introduction of a feudal system of landholding. By the time of William's death in 1087, England formed the largest part of an Anglo-Norman empire, ruled by nobles with landholdings across England, Normandy and Wales. William's sons disputed succession to his lands, with William II emerging as ruler of England and much of Normandy. On his death in 1100 his younger brother claimed the throne as Henry I and defeated his brother Robert to reunite England and Normandy. Henry was a ruthless yet effective king, but after the death of his only male heir William Adelin in the White Ship tragedy, he persuaded his barons to recognise his daughter Matilda as heir. When Henry died in 1135 her cousin Stephen of Blois had himself proclaimed king, leading to a civil war known as The Anarchy. Eventually Stephen recognised Matilda's son Henry as his heir and when Stephen died in 1154, he succeeded as Henry II.

Henry, considered the first Angevin king of England, had extensive holdings in France and asserted his authority over Wales, Scotland and Ireland. He clashed with his appointee to the Archbishopric of Canterbury Thomas Becket, resulting in Becket's murder and Henry making a dramatic exhibition of penance. The later part of his reign was dominated by rebellions involving his sons and Philip II of France that forced him to accept his son Richard as sole heir. Richard acceded to the Angevin inheritance on Henry's death in 1189 and almost immediately departed on a Crusade. On his return journey he was taken hostage in Germany and a huge ransom was paid in order to secure his release in 1194. He spent the remainder of his reign restoring his lands in France, dying in 1199. His younger brother John succeeded in England, and fought a successful war against Richard's nephew Arthur for control of the French possession. John's behaviour led to rebellions by the Norman and Angevin barons that broke his control of the continental possessions. His attempt to retake Normandy and Anjou was defeated at the Battle of Bouvines. This weakened his position in England, eventually resulting in the treaty called Magna Carta, which limited royal power, and the First Barons' War. His death in 1216 is considered by some historians to mark the end of the Angevin period and the beginning of the Plantagenet dynasty.

The Normans adopted many Anglo-Saxon governmental institutions, but the feudal system concentrated more power in the hands of the king and a small elite. The rights and roles of women became more sharply defined. Noblewomen remained significant cultural and religious patrons and played an important part in political and military events. During the twelfth century divisions between conquerors and the English began to dissolve and they began to consider themselves superior to their Celtic neighbours. The conquest brought Norman and French churchmen to power. New reformed religious and military orders were introduced into England. By the early thirteenth century the church had largely won its argument for independence from the state, answering almost entirely to Rome. Pilgrimages were a popular religious practice and accumulating relics became important for ambitious institutions. England played a prominent part in the Second, Third and Fifth Crusades.

Between the ninth and thirteenth centuries England went through the Medieval Warm Period, a prolonged period of warmer temperatures that allowed poorer land to be brought into cultivation. Agricultural land became typically organised around manors. By the eleventh century, a market economy was flourishing across much of England, while the eastern and southern towns were heavily involved in international trade. Many hundreds of new towns, some of them planned communities, were built, supporting the creation of guilds and charter fairs. Anglo-Norman warfare was characterised by attritional military campaigns of raids and seizure of castles. Naval forces enabled the transportation of troops and supplies, raids into hostile territory and attacks on enemy fleets. After the conquest the Normans built timber motte and bailey and ringwork castles in large numbers, which were replaced by stone buildings from the twelfth century. The period has been used in a wide range of popular culture, including William Shakespeare's plays. Walter Scott's location of Robin Hood in the reign of Richard I and his emphasis on the conflict between Saxons and Normans set the template for later fiction and film adaptations.

Political history

Normans

Norman conquest

In 1002 King Æthelred II of England married Emma, the sister of  Richard II, Duke of Normandy. Their son Edward the Confessor, who spent many years in exile in Normandy, succeeded to the English throne in 1042. This led to the establishment of a powerful Norman interest in English politics, as Edward drew heavily on his former hosts for support, bringing in Norman courtiers, soldiers, and clerics and appointing them to positions of power, particularly in the Church. Childless and embroiled in conflict with the formidable Godwin, Earl of Wessex, and his sons, Edward may also have encouraged Duke William of Normandy's ambitions for the English throne.

When King Edward died at the beginning of 1066, the lack of a clear heir led to a disputed succession in which several contenders laid claim to the throne of England. Edward's immediate successor was the Earl of Wessex, Harold Godwinson, the richest and most powerful of the English aristocrats. Harold was elected king by the Witenagemot of England and crowned by the Archbishop of York, Ealdred, although Norman propaganda claimed the ceremony was performed by Stigand, the uncanonically elected Archbishop of Canterbury. Harold was immediately challenged by two powerful neighbouring rulers. Duke William claimed that he had been promised the throne by King Edward and that Harold had sworn agreement to this; King Harald III of Norway, commonly known as Harald Hardrada, also contested the succession. His claim to the throne was based on an agreement between his predecessor Magnus I of Norway and the earlier English king, Harthacnut, whereby if either died without heir, the other would inherit both England and Norway. William and Harald at once set about assembling troops and ships to invade England. Tostig Godwinson, brother of Harold, made a series of attacks in the north of England in early 1066 that may have been the beginning of a bid for the throne, but after defeat at the hands of Edwin and Morcar and the desertion of most of his followers he threw his lot in with Harald Hardrada, who invaded northern England in early September. Harold defeated and killed Hardrada and Tostig at the battle of Stamford Bridge. William invaded with an army of Norman followers and mercenaries. Harold marched south to meet him, but was defeated and killed at the battle of Hastings on 14 October and William's forces rapidly occupied the south of England.

William I (1066–87)

Major revolts followed, which William suppressed before intervening in the north-east of England, establishing Norman control of York and devastating the region. Once England had been conquered, the Normans faced many challenges in maintaining control. They were few in number compared to the native English population; including those from other parts of France, historians estimate the number of Norman settlers at around 8,000. William's followers expected and received lands and titles in return for their service in the invasion, but William claimed ultimate possession of the land in England over which his armies had given him de facto control, and asserted the right to dispose of it as he saw fit. Henceforth, all land was "held" directly from the king in feudal tenure in return for military service. A Norman lord typically had properties located in a piecemeal fashion throughout England and Normandy, and not in a single geographic block.

To find the lands to compensate his Norman followers, William initially confiscated the estates of all the English lords who had fought and died with Harold and redistributed part of their lands. These confiscations led to revolts, which resulted in more confiscations, a cycle that continued for five years after the Battle of Hastings. To put down and prevent further rebellions the Normans constructed castles and fortifications in unprecedented numbers, initially mostly on the motte-and-bailey pattern. William and his barons also exercised tighter control over inheritance of property by widows and daughters, often forcing marriages to Normans. Some Norman lords used England as a launching point for attacks into South and North Wales, spreading up the valleys to create new Marcher territories. By the time of William's death in 1087, England formed the largest part of an Anglo-Norman empire, ruled over by a network of nobles with landholdings across England, Normandy, and Wales. England's growing wealth was critical in allowing the Norman kings to project power across the region, including funding campaigns along the frontiers of Normandy.

At Christmas 1085, William ordered the compilation of a survey of the landholdings held by himself and by his vassals throughout the kingdom, organised by counties, a work now known as the Domesday Book. The listing for each county gives the holdings of each landholder, grouped by owners. The listings describe the holding, who owned the land before the Conquest, its value, what the tax assessment was, and usually the number of peasants, ploughs, and any other resources the holding had. Towns were listed separately. All the English counties south of the River Tees and River Ribble are included, and the whole work seems to have been mostly completed by 1 August 1086, when the Anglo-Saxon Chronicle records that William received the results and that all the chief magnates swore the Salisbury Oath, a renewal of their oaths of allegiance.

William II (1087–1100)

At the death of William the Conqueror in 1087 his lands were divided into two parts. His Norman lands went to the eldest son Robert Curthose and his English lands to the younger William Rufus. This presented a dilemma for those nobles who held land on both sides of the waterway of the English Channel, who decided to unite England and Normandy once more under one ruler. The pursuit of this aim led them to revolt against William in favour of Robert in the Rebellion of 1088, under the leadership of the powerful Bishop Odo of Bayeux, who was a half-brother of William the Conqueror. As Robert failed to appear in England to rally his supporters, William won the support of the English lords with silver and promises of better government, and defeated the rebellion. In 1091 he invaded Normandy, crushing Robert's forces and forcing him to cede a portion of his lands. The two made up their differences and William agreed to help Robert recover lands lost to the King of France, notably Le Maine. This plan was later abandoned, but William continued to pursue a ferociously warlike defence of his French possessions and interests, exemplified by his response to the attempt by Elias de la Flèche, Count of Maine, to take Le Mans in 1099. William came into conflict with Anselm, Archbishop of Canterbury over Gregorian reforms in the Church. Eventually Anselm went into exile and Pope Urban II, involved in a major conflict with the Holy Roman Emperor Henry IV, came to a concordat with William, whereby William recognised Urban as pope, and Urban gave sanction to the Anglo-Norman ecclesiastical status quo. Anselm remained in exile, and William was able to claim the revenues of the archbishop of Canterbury to the end of his reign. William died while hunting in 1100.

Henry I (1100–35)

Despite Robert's rival claims, his younger brother Henry immediately seized power in England. Robert, who invaded in 1101, disputed Henry's control of England. This military campaign ended in a negotiated settlement that confirmed Henry as king. The peace was short-lived, and Henry invaded the Duchy of Normandy in 1105 and 1106, finally defeating Robert at the Battle of Tinchebray. Henry kept Robert imprisoned for the rest of his life. Henry's control of Normandy was challenged by Louis VI of France, Baldwin of Flanders and Fulk of Anjou, who promoted the rival claims of Robert's son, William Clito, and supported a major rebellion in the Duchy between 1116 and 1119. Following Henry's victory at the Battle of Brémule, a favourable peace settlement was agreed with Louis in 1120.

Considered by contemporaries to be a harsh but effective ruler, Henry skilfully manipulated the barons in England and Normandy. In England, he drew on the existing Anglo-Saxon system of justice, local government and taxation, but also strengthened it with additional institutions, including the royal exchequer and itinerant justices. Normandy was also governed through a growing system of justices and an exchequer. Many of the officials that ran Henry's system were "new men", relatively low-born individuals who rose through the ranks as administrators. Henry encouraged ecclesiastical reform, but from 1101 he also became embroiled in a serious dispute  with Archbishop Anselm, which was resolved through a compromise solution in 1105. He supported the Cluniac order and played a major role in the selection of the senior clergy in England and Normandy.

Stephen, Matilda and the Anarchy (1135–54)

Henry's only legitimate son, William, died aboard the White Ship in the disaster of 1120, sparking a fresh succession crisis. Henry named his daughter Matilda as his heir, but on Henry's death in 1135 her cousin Stephen of Blois had himself proclaimed king. Matilda's husband Geoffrey, Count of Anjou showed little interest in England, but he supported Matilda by entering Normandy to claim her inheritance. Matilda landed in England to challenge Stephen and was declared "Lady of the English" which resulted in a civil war called the Anarchy. Stephen was defeated and captured at the Battle of Lincoln (1141) and Matilda was the effective ruler. When Matilda was forced to release Stephen in a hostage exchange for her half-brother Robert, 1st Earl of Gloucester, Stephen was re-crowned. The conflict in England continued inconclusively. However, Geoffrey secured the Duchy of Normandy. Matilda's son, Henry II, by his marriage to Eleanor of Aquitaine had acquired the Duchy of Aquitaine and was now immensely rich. With skilful negotiation with the war-weary barons of England and King Stephen, he agreed to the Treaty of Wallingford and was recognised as Stephen's heir.

Angevins

Henry II (1154–89)

After Stephen's death in 1154 Henry succeeded as the first Angevin king of England, so-called because he was also the Count of Anjou in Northern France, adding it to his extensive holdings in Normandy and Aquitaine. England became a key part of a loose-knit assemblage of lands spread across Western Europe, later termed the Angevin Empire.

Henry asserted his authority over Brittany, even reorganising the Duchy into eight administrative districts and introducing Angevin legal reforms. He pursued an aggressive policy in Wales, reclaiming lands lost by Anglo-Norman princes and conducting four punitive campaigns against Welsh princes that resulted in their submission to his authority. This underlined his overlordship, but he did not attempt a direct conquest. When the Scottish king William the Lion joined the rebellion of Henry's sons and was captured, it allowed Henry to extract homage from the Scottish king under the Treaty of Falaise (1174), which he did not pursue directly, but which would provide a justification for later interventions in Scottish kingship.

In the mid-twelfth century Ireland was ruled by local kings, although their authority was more limited than their counterparts in the rest of western Europe. In the 1160s deposed King Diarmait Mac Murchada King of Leinster turned to Henry for assistance in 1167, and the English king agreed to allow Diarmait to recruit mercenaries within his empire. Diarmait put together a force of Anglo-Norman and Flemish mercenaries drawn from the Welsh Marches, including Richard de Clare, known as Strongbow. With his new supporters, he reclaimed Leinster but died shortly afterwards in 1171; de Clare then claimed Leinster for himself. Henry took this opportunity to intervene personally in Ireland, landing in October 1171. Henry's timing was influenced by several factors, including encouragement from Pope Alexander, who saw the opportunity to establish papal authority over the Irish church. Henry's intervention was initially successful, with both the Irish and Anglo-Normans in the south and east of Ireland accepting his rule. However, the Treaty of Windsor in 1175, under which Rory O'Connor would be recognised as the high king of Ireland, giving homage to Henry and maintaining stability on the ground on his behalf, meant that he had little direct control.

Henry saw an opportunity to re-establish what he saw as his rights over the Church in England by reasserting the privileges held by Henry I when Theobald, Archbishop of Canterbury, died, by appointing his friend, Thomas Becket to the post. Henry had clashed with the church over whether bishops could excommunicate royal officials without his permission and whether he could try clerics without them appealing to Rome. However, Becket opposed Henry's Constitutions of Clarendon and fled into exile. Relations later improved, allowing Becket's return, but soon soured again when Becket saw the crowning as coregent of Henry's son by the Archbishop of York as a challenge to his authority and excommunicated those who had offended him. On hearing the news Henry uttered the infamous phrase "What miserable drones and traitors have I nurtured and promoted in my household who let their lord be treated with such shameful contempt by a low born clerk". In response to please Henry three of his men murdered Becket in Canterbury Cathedral, probably by misadventure after Becket resisted a botched arrest attempt. In Christian Europe Henry was considered complicit in this crime, making him a pariah, and he was forced to make a dramatic exhibition of penance, publicly walking barefoot into the cathedral and allowing monks to scourge him.

When Henry II attempted to give his land-less youngest son, John, a wedding gift of three castles it prompted his three eldest sons and wife to rebel in the Revolt of 1173–1174. Louis VII encouraged the three elder sons to destabilise his mightiest subject and not to wait for their inheritances. It was only after eighteen months of conflict that Henry II was able to force the rebels to submit to his authority. In Le Mans in 1182 Henry II gathered his children to plan for partible inheritance in which his eldest son, also called Henry, would inherit England, Normandy and Anjou; Richard the Duchy of Aquitaine; Geoffrey Brittany and John would receive Ireland. This broke down into further conflict and the younger Henry rebelled again, but died of dysentery. In 1186 Geoffrey died as a result of a tournament accident but Henry was still reluctant to have a sole heir  so, in 1189, Richard and Philip II of France took advantage of a sickening Henry II with more success. Henry II was forced to accept humiliating peace terms, including naming Richard as sole heir. When Henry II died shortly afterwards his last words to Richard were allegedly "God grant that I may not die until I have my revenge on you".

Richard I (1189–99)

On the day of Richard's English coronation there was a mass slaughter of the Jews, described by Richard of Devizes as a "holocaust". Quickly putting the affairs of the Angevin Empire in order he departed on Crusade to the Middle East in early 1190. In Sicily he came into conflict with Tancred I over the rights of Richard's sister Queen Joan, widow of the former king William II of Sicily. Richard captured the city of Messina on 4 October 1190 and using it to force Tancred into a peace agreement. When his sister and his fiancée Berengaria along with several other ships, including the treasure ship were seized by the island's despot Isaac Komnenos, Richard conquered the island, which became a western feudal and Christian base in the Mediterranean.

Opinions of Richard amongst his contemporaries were mixed. He had rejected and humiliated the king of France's sister; insulted and refused spoils of the third crusade to nobles like Leopold V, Duke of Austria, and was rumoured to have arranged the assassination of Conrad of Montferrat. His cruelty was demonstrated by his massacre of 2,600 prisoners in Acre. However, Richard was respected for his military leadership and courtly manners. He achieved victories in the Third Crusade but failed to capture Jerusalem, retreating from the Holy Land with a small band of followers.

Richard was captured by Leopold on his return journey in 1192. Custody was passed to Henry the Lion and a tax of 25 percent of movables and income was required in England to pay the ransom of 100,000 marks, with a promise of 50,000 more, before Richard was released in 1194. In his absence Philip II of France had overrun much of Normandy, while John of England controlled much of the remainder of Richard's lands. On his return to England, Richard forgave John and re-established his control. Leaving England in 1194 never to return, Richard battled Phillip for the next five years for the return of the holdings seized during his incarceration. Close to total victory he was injured by an arrow during the siege of Château de Châlus-Chabrol and died after lingering injured for ten days.

John (1199–1216)

Richard's failure in his duty to provide an heir caused a succession crisis. Anjou, Brittany, Maine and Touraine chose Richard's nephew and nominated heir, Arthur, while John succeeded in England and Normandy. Yet again Philip II of France took the opportunity to destabilise the Plantagenet territories on the European mainland, supporting his vassal Arthur's claim to the English crown. When Arthur's forces threatened his mother, John won a significant victory, capturing the entire rebel leadership at the Battle of Mirebeau. Arthur was murdered, it was rumoured by John's own hands, and his sister Eleanor would spend the rest of her life in captivity. John's behaviour drove numerous French barons to side with Phillip. The resulting rebellions by the Norman and Angevin barons broke John's control of the continental possessions, leading to the de facto end of the Angevin Empire, even though Henry III would maintain the claim until 1259.

After re-establishing his authority in England, John planned to retake Normandy and Anjou. The strategy was to draw the French from Paris while another army, under Otto IV, Holy Roman Emperor, attacked from the north. However, his allies were defeated at the Battle of Bouvines in one of the most decisive and symbolic battles in French history. The battle had both important and high-profile consequences. John's nephew Otto retreated and was soon overthrown while King John agreed to a five-year truce. Philip's decisive victory was crucial in ordering politics in both England and France. The battle was instrumental in forming the absolute monarchy in France.

John's defeats in France weakened his position in England. The rebellion of his English vassals resulted in the treaty called Magna Carta, which limited royal power and established common law. This would form the basis of every constitutional battle through the thirteenth and fourteenth centuries. However, both the barons and the crown failed to abide by the terms of Magna Carta, leading to the First Barons' War in which the rebel barons invited an invasion by Prince Louis. This is considered by some historians to mark the end of the Angevin period and the beginning of the Plantagenet dynasty with John's death and William Marshall's appointment as the protector of the nine-year-old Henry III. Marshall won the war with victories at the battles of Lincoln and Dover in 1217, leading to the Treaty of Lambeth by which Louis renounced his claims. In victory, the Marshal Protectorate reissued the Magna Carta agreement as a basis for future government.

Government

Within twenty years of the Norman conquest, the Anglo-Saxon elite had been replaced by a new class of Norman nobility. The new earls (successors to the ealdermen), sheriffs and senior clergy were all drawn from their ranks. In many areas of society there was continuity, as the Normans adopted many of the Anglo-Saxon governmental institutions, including the tax system, mints and the centralisation of law-making and some judicial matters; initially sheriffs and the hundred courts continued to function as before.

The method of government after the conquest can be described as a feudal system, in that the new nobles held their lands on behalf of the king; in return for promising to provide military support and taking an oath of allegiance, called homage, they were granted lands termed a fief or an honour. Major nobles in turn granted lands to smaller landowners in return for homage and further military support, and eventually the peasantry held land in return for local labour services, creating a web of loyalties and resources enforced in part by new honorial courts. This system had been used in Normandy and concentrated more power in the king and the upper elite than the former Anglo-Saxon system of government. The practice of slavery declined in the years after the conquest, as the Normans considered the practice backward and contrary to the teachings of the church. The more prosperous peasants, however, lost influence and power as the Normans made holding land more dependent on providing labour services to the local lord. They sank down the economic hierarchy, swelling the numbers of unfree villeins or serfs, forbidden to leave their manor or seek alternative employment.

At the centre of power, the kings employed a succession of clergy as chancellors, responsible for running the royal chancery, while the familia regis, the military household, emerged to act as a bodyguard and military staff. England's bishops continued to form an important part in local administration, alongside the nobility. Henry I and Henry II both implemented significant legal reforms, extending and widening the scope of centralised, royal law; by the 1180s, the basis for the future English common law had largely been established, with a standing law court in Westminster—an early Common Bench—and travelling judges conducting eyres around the country. King John extended the royal role in delivering justice, and the extent of appropriate royal intervention was one of the issues addressed in the Magna Carta of 1215.

Many tensions existed within the system of government. Royal landowning and wealth stretched across England, and placed the king in a privileged position above even the most powerful of the noble elite. Successive kings still needed more resources to pay for military campaigns, conduct building programmes, or to reward their followers, and this meant exercising their feudal rights to interfere in the land-holdings of nobles. This was contentious and a frequent issue of complaint, as there was a growing belief that land should be held by hereditary right, not through the favour of the king. Property and wealth became increasingly focused in the hands of a subset of the nobility, the great magnates, at the expense of the wider baronage, encouraging the breakdown of some aspects of local feudalism. As time went by, the Norman nobility intermarried with many of the great Anglo-Saxon families, and the links with the Duchy began to weaken. By the late twelfth century, mobilising the English barons to fight on the continent was proving difficult, and John's attempts to do so ended in civil war.

Society

Women in society

Medieval England was a patriarchal society and the lives of women were heavily influenced by contemporary beliefs about gender and authority. However, the position of women varied according to factors including their social class; whether they were unmarried, married, widowed or remarried; and in which part of the country they lived. Significant gender inequities persisted throughout the period, as women typically had more limited life-choices, access to employment and trade, and legal rights than men. After the Norman Conquest, the position of women in society changed. The rights and roles of women became more sharply defined, in part as a result of the development of the feudal system and the expansion of the English legal system; some women benefited from this, while others lost out. The rights of widows were formally laid down in law by the end of the twelfth century, clarifying the right of free women to own property, but this did not necessarily prevent women from being forcibly remarried against their wishes. The growth of governmental institutions under a succession of bishops reduced the role of queens and their households in formal government. Married or widowed noblewomen remained significant cultural and religious patrons and played an important part in political and military events, even if chroniclers were uncertain if this was appropriate behaviour. As in earlier centuries, most women worked in agriculture, but here roles became more clearly gendered, with ploughing and managing the fields defined as men's work, for example, and dairy production becoming dominated by women.

Identity

The Normans and French who arrived after the conquest saw themselves as different from the English. They had close family and economic links to the Duchy of Normandy, spoke Norman French and had their own distinctive culture. For many years, to be English was to be associated with military failure and serfdom. During the twelfth century, the divisions between the English and Normans began to dissolve as a result of intermarriage and cohabitation.  By the end of the twelfth century, and possibly as early as the 1150s, contemporary commentators believed the two peoples to be blending, and the loss of the Duchy in 1204 reinforced this trend. The resulting society still prized wider French cultural values, however, and French remained the language of the court, business and international affairs, even if Parisians mocked the English for their poor pronunciation. During the twelfth and thirteenth centuries, the English began to consider themselves superior to the Welsh, Scots and Bretons. The English perceived themselves as civilised, economically prosperous and properly Christian, while the Celtic fringe was considered lazy, barbarous and backward. Following the invasion of Ireland in the late twelfth century, similar feelings were expressed about the Irish.

Religion

Ecclesiastical structures and orders

The 1066 Norman conquest brought a new set of Norman and French churchmen to power; some adopted and embraced aspects of the former Anglo-Saxon religious system, while others introduced practices from Normandy. Extensive English lands were granted to monasteries in Normandy, allowing them to create daughter priories and monastic cells across the kingdom. The monasteries were brought firmly into the web of feudal relations, with their holding of land linked to the provision of military support to the crown. The Normans adopted the Anglo-Saxon model of monastic cathedral communities, and within seventy years the majority of English cathedrals were controlled by monks; every English cathedral, however, was rebuilt to some extent by the new rulers. England's bishops remained powerful temporal figures, and in the early twelfth-century raised armies against Scottish invaders and built up extensive holdings of castles across the country.

New orders began to be introduced into England. As ties to Normandy waned, the French Cluniac order became fashionable and their houses were introduced in England. The Augustinians spread quickly from the beginning of the twelfth century onwards, while later in the century the Cistercians reached England, creating houses with a more austere interpretation of the monastic rules and building the great abbeys of Rievaulx and Fountains. By 1215, there were over 600 monastic communities in England, but new endowments slowed during the thirteenth century, creating long-term financial problems for many institutions. The religious military orders that became popular across Europe from the twelfth century onwards, including the Templars, Teutonic Knights and Hospitallers, acquired possessions in England.

Church and state

William the Conqueror acquired the support of the Church for the invasion of England by promising ecclesiastical reform. William promoted celibacy amongst the clergy and gave ecclesiastical courts more power, but also reduced the Church's direct links to Rome and made it more accountable to the king. Tensions arose between these practices and the reforming movement of Pope Gregory VII, which advocated greater autonomy from royal authority for the clergy, condemned the practice of simony and promoted greater influence for the papacy in church matters. Despite the bishops continuing to play a major part in royal government, tensions emerged between the kings of England and key leaders within the English Church. Kings and archbishops clashed over rights of appointment and religious policy, and successive archbishops including Anselm, Theobald of Bec, Thomas Becket and Stephen Langton were variously forced into exile, arrested by royal knights or even killed. By the early thirteenth century, however, the church had largely won its argument for independence, answering almost entirely to Rome.

Pilgrimages
Pilgrimages were a popular religious practice throughout the Middle Ages in England, with the tradition dating back to the Roman period. Typically pilgrims would travel short distances to a shrine or a particular church, either to do penance for a perceived sin, or to seek relief from an illness or other condition. Some pilgrims travelled further, either to more distant sites within Britain or, in a few cases, onto the continent. Under the Normans, religious institutions with important shrines, such as Glastonbury, Canterbury and Winchester, promoted themselves as pilgrimage destinations, maximising the value of the historic miracles associated with the sites. Accumulating relics became an important task for ambitious institutions, as these were believed to hold curative powers and lent status to the site. By the twelfth century reports of posthumous miracles by local saints were becoming increasingly common in England, adding to the attractiveness of pilgrimages to prominent relics.

Crusades
The idea of undertaking a pilgrimage to Jerusalem was not new in England, as the idea of religiously justified warfare went back to Anglo-Saxon times. While English participation in the First Crusade between 1095–99 was limited, England played a prominent part in the Second, Third and Fifth Crusades over the next two centuries, with many crusaders leaving for the Levant during the intervening years. Many of those who took up the Cross to go on a Crusade never actually left, often because the individual lacked sufficient funds to undertake the journey. Raising funds to travel typically involved crusaders selling or mortgaging their lands and possessions, which affected their families and, at times, the economy as a whole was considerably affected.

Geography

England had a diverse geography in the medieval period, from the Fenlands of East Anglia or the heavily wooded Weald, through to the upland moors of Yorkshire. Despite this, medieval England broadly formed two zones, roughly divided by the rivers Exe and Tes: the south and east of England had lighter, richer soils, able to support both arable and pastoral agriculture, while the poorer soils and colder climate [sic] of the north and west produced a predominantly pastoral economy. Slightly more land was covered by trees than in the twentieth century, and bears, beavers and wolves lived wild in England, bears being hunted to extinction by the eleventh century and beavers by the twelfth.

Of the 10,000 miles of roads that had been built by the Romans, many remained in use and four were of particular strategic importance—the Icknield Way, the Fosse Way, Ermine Street and Watling Street—which criss-crossed the entire country. The road system was adequate for the needs of the period, although it was significantly cheaper to transport goods by water. The major river networks formed key transport routes, while many English towns formed navigable inland ports.

For much of the Middle Ages, England's climate differed from that in the twenty-first century. Between the ninth and thirteenth centuries England went through the Medieval Warm Period, a prolonged period of warmer temperatures; in the early thirteenth century, for example, summers were around 1 °C warmer than today and the climate was slightly drier. These warmer temperatures allowed poorer land to be brought into cultivation and for grapevines to be cultivated relatively far north.

Economy and demography

The English economy was fundamentally agricultural, depending on growing crops such as wheat, barley and oats on an open field system, and husbanding sheep, cattle and pigs. Agricultural land became typically organised around manors, and was divided between some fields that the landowner would manage directly, called demesne land, and the majority of the fields that would be cultivated by local peasants. These peasants would pay rent to the landowner either through agricultural labour on the lord's demesne fields or through rent in the form of cash and produce. By the eleventh century, a market economy was flourishing across much of England, while the eastern and southern towns were heavily involved in international trade. Around 6,000 watermills were built to grind flour, freeing up labour for other more productive agricultural tasks.

Although the Norman invasion caused some damage as soldiers looted the countryside and land was confiscated for castle building, the English economy was not greatly affected. Taxes were increased, however, and the Normans established extensive forests that were exploited for their natural resources and protected by royal laws. The next two centuries saw huge growth in the English economy, driven in part by the increase in the population from around 1.5 million in 1086 to between 4 and 5 million in 1300. More land, much of it at the expense of the royal forests, was brought into production to feed the growing population and to produce wool for export to Europe. Many hundreds of new towns, some of them planned communities, were built across England, supporting the creation of guilds, charter fairs and other medieval institutions which governed the growing trade. Jewish financiers played a significant role in funding the growing economy, along with the new Cistercian and Augustinian religious orders that emerged as major players in the wool trade of the north. Mining increased in England, with a silver boom in the twelfth century helping to fuel the expansion of the money supply.

Warfare

Anglo-Norman warfare was characterised by attritional military campaigns, in which commanders tried to raid enemy lands and seize castles in order to allow them to take control of their adversaries' territory, ultimately winning slow but strategic victories. Pitched battles were occasionally fought between armies but these were considered risky engagements and usually avoided by prudent commanders. The armies of the period comprised bodies of mounted, armoured knights, supported by infantry. Crossbowmen become more numerous in the twelfth century, alongside the older shortbow. At the heart of these armies was the familia regis, the permanent military household of the king, which was supported in war by feudal levies, drawn up by local nobles for a limited period of service during a campaign. Mercenaries were increasingly employed, driving up the cost of warfare, and adequate supplies of ready cash became essential for the success of campaigns.

Naval forces played an important role during the Middle Ages, enabling the transportation of troops and supplies, raids into hostile territory and attacks on enemy fleets. English naval power became particularly important after the loss of Normandy in 1204, which turned the English Channel from a friendly transit route into a contested and critical border region.

Although a small number of castles had been built in England during the 1050s, after the conquest the Normans began to build timber motte and bailey and ringwork castles in large numbers to control their newly occupied territories. During the twelfth century the Normans began to build more castles in stone, with characteristic square keeps that supported both military and political functions. Royal castles were used to control key towns and forests, whilst baronial castles were used by the Norman lords to control their widespread estates; a feudal system called the castle-guard was sometimes used to provide garrisons. Castles and sieges continued to grow in military sophistication during the twelfth century.

Culture

Art

The Norman conquest introduced northern French artistic styles, particular in illuminated manuscripts and murals, and reduced the demand for carvings. In other artistic areas, including embroidery, the Anglo-Saxon influence remained evident into the twelfth century, and the famous Bayeux Tapestry is an example of older styles being reemployed under the new regime. Stained glass had been introduced into Anglo-Saxon England. Very few examples of glass survive from the Norman period, but there are a few examples that survive from minor monasteries and parish churches. The largest collections of twelfth-century stained glass at the Cathedrals of York and Canterbury.

Literature and music

Poetry and stories written in French were popular after the Norman conquest, and by the twelfth century some works on English history began to be produced in French verse. Romantic poems about tournaments and courtly love became popular in Paris and this fashion spread into England in the form of lays; stories about the court of King Arthur were also fashionable, due in part to the interest of Henry II. English continued to be used on a modest scale to write local religious works and some poems in the north of England, but most major works were produced in Latin or French. Music and singing were important in England during the medieval period, being used in religious ceremonies, court occasions and to accompany theatrical works. From the eleventh century distinctive monophonic plainchant was superseded, as elsewhere in Europe, by standardised Gregorian chant.

Architecture

The Normans brought with them architectural styles from their own duchy, where austere stone churches were preferred. Under the early Norman kings this style was adapted to produce large, plain cathedrals with ribbed vaulting. During the twelfth century the Anglo-Norman style became richer and more ornate, with pointed arches derived from French architecture replacing the curved Romanesque designs; this style is termed Early English Gothic and continued, with variation, throughout the rest of the Middle Ages. In domestic architecture, the Normans, having first occupied the older Anglo-Saxon dwellings, rapidly beginning to build larger buildings in stone and timber. The elite preferred houses with large, ground-floor halls but the less wealthy constructed simpler houses with the halls on the first floor; master and servants frequently lived in the same spaces. Wealthier town-houses were also built using stone, and incorporated business and domestic arrangements into a single functional design.

Popular representations

The period has been used in a wide range of popular culture. William Shakespeare's plays on the lives of the medieval kings have proved to have had long lasting appeal, heavily influencing both popular interpretations and histories of figures such as King John. Other playwrights have since taken key events and personalities as the subject of drama, including T. S. Eliot's Murder in the Cathedral (1935) and Jean Anouilh's Becket (1959), that focus on the death of Thomas Becket and James Goldman's The Lion in Winter (1966), which focuses on Henry II and his sons. Walter Scott's location of Robin Hood in the reign of Richard I and his emphasis on the conflict between Saxons and Normans set the template for much later fiction and film adaptations. Historical fiction set in England during the Middle Ages remains persistently popular, with the 1980s and 1990s seeing a particular growth of historical detective fiction such as Ellis Peters's The Cadfael Chronicles set in the Anarchy, which is also the location of much of Ken Follett's best-selling The Pillars of the Earth (1989). Film-makers have drawn extensively on the medieval period, often taking themes from Shakespeare or the Robin Hood ballads for inspiration and adapting historical romantic novels as Ivanhoe (1952). More recent revivals of these genres include Robin Hood: Prince of Thieves (1991) and Kingdom of Heaven (2005).

See also
 Sussex in the High Middle Ages

References

Notes

Bibliography

 
 
 
 
 
 
 
 
 
 
 
 
 
 
 
 
 

 
 
 
 
 
 
 
 
 

 

 
 
 
 
 
 
 
 
 
 
 
 
 
 
 
 
 
 
 
 
 
  
 
 
 
 
 
 
 
 
 
 

  
 
 

 
 
 
 
 
 
 

 
 * 

 
 
 
 
 
 
 
 
 
 

 
.
.
.